La Clusaz is a commune in the Haute-Savoie department in the Auvergne-Rhône-Alpes region in south-eastern France.

Overview
It is a ski resort in the Alps near the Swiss border. The commune of La Clusaz is part of the Haute-Savoie département. An old village, La Clusaz has been hosting winter sports since 1907. It is the birthplace of French skiers Guy Périllat and Vincent Vittoz and sailor Philippe Monnet. Located in the Aravis mountain range La Clusaz (originally from the word cluse - meaning a narrow path between two mountains) was once called Clusa Locus Dei meaning God's narrow place.

In 1902, the opening of the road connecting Annecy and the valley of Thônes with the Aravis Valley which allowed La Clusaz (formerly a small and remote village) to become a tourist center for summer and winter sports.

In 1956, the first cable car was introduced. The commune of La Clusaz is classified winter sports resort and of alpinism per decree of June 18, 1969. The first luge was added in 1985. The first snow cannon was added in 1994.

Geography
There are a number of different lakes nearby, the best known of which is the Lac des Confins.

Coat of arms
Many sheep herds were found in the parish of La Clusaz. The King of Sardinia, the Duke of Savoy, no doubt wished to evoke this pastoral activity, in 1602 gave the village the right to use the arms of “a silver sheep on a green field”.

Nearby
Nearby villages include Manigod, Thônes, Le Grand Bornand, Saint-Jean-de-Sixt and the larger Chamonix.

Tourism

La Clusaz's main tourist draw is skiing during the winter season. It has introduced a number of different skiers including:

Candide Thovex,
Vincent Vittoz,
Mirabelle Thovex,
Guy Perillat,
Alain Pessey,
Sam Phelps,
Catherine Lombard,
Raphaelle Monod,
Edgar Grospiron,
Regine Cavagnoud,
Loic Collomb-Patton,
Laurent Favre
william bardsley.

Shopping in La Clusaz is much like other small alpine villages  - centred on local shops specialising in either local delicacies such as cheese, meats and wines, or ski shops.

Le Tour de France in La Clusaz
The Tour de France tends to pass through La Clusaz every few years, often ending in Le Grand Bornand after the tough climb up Col des Aravis. The route started in Morzine. The climb from town to the summit of the Aravis is approximately 7 percent. It is a category 2 climb. After the summit, there is a descent into a tunnel and on to the Col des Saisies. The stage ended in Saint Jean de Maurienne.

Horse-back riding in La Clusaz 

Horse rides are offered in the early morning before starting the day's skiing, or at the end of the day at sunset.

In Popular Culture
 Webfield/Webber (2017/2021)'La Clusaz' is the title of an English novella and audio-book set in the 1950s in the town and on the surrounding mountains (TOCYPress).

See also
Communes of the Haute-Savoie department

References

External links

Official tourist information office site

Communes of Haute-Savoie
Ski resorts in France
La Clusaz